Športno nogometni klub Bakovci, commonly referred to as ŠNK Bakovci or simply Bakovci, is a Slovenian football club from the village of Bakovci. Their main colours are red and white. They currently play in the 1. MNL, the fifth tier of the Slovenian football pyramid. The club was established in 1953. Their home ground is ŠRC Bakovci with a seating capacity for 500 spectators.

Honours
Slovenian Third League
 Winners: 2000–01

Slovenian Fourth Division
 Winners: 1992–93, 1993–94

Slovenian Fifth Division
 Winners: 2012–13

League history since 1991

References

Football clubs in Slovenia
Association football clubs established in 1953
1953 establishments in Slovenia